The Carlos Palanca Memorial Awards for Literature winners in the year 2003 (rank, name of author, title of winning entry):


English division

Poetry
First prize: Isidoro Cruz, "Bodies Of Water"
Second prize: Angelo Suarez, "Exploratoria"
Third prize: Mike Maniquiz, "Tornadoes and Other Poems"

Short story
 First prize: Rosario Cruz Lucero, "Doreen's Story"
 Second prize: Socorro Villanueva, "Foggy Makes Me Sad"
 Third prize: Paul de Guzman, "The index of Forbidden Books"

Futuristic Fiction
 First prize: No winner
 Second prize: No winner
 Third prize: Yvette Natalia Uy Tan, "Sidhi"

Short story for children
 First prize: Honoel A. Ibardolaza, "The Greediest of Rajahs and the Whitest of Clouds"
 Second prize: Cyan Abad-Jugo, "Behind The Old Aparador"
 Third prize: Yvette Natalie Uy Tan, "Kulog"

Essay
 First prize: Rosario Cruz Lucero, "The Music Of Pestle-On-Mortar"
 Second prize: Lourd Ernest de Veyra, "Videoke Blues"
 Third prize: Xerxes Matza, "Licking Lollies: The Re-education of the Accidental American" 

One-act play
 First prize: No winner.
 Second prize: Dean Francis Alfar, "The Onan Circle"
 Third prize: Glenn Sevilla Mas, "The Birth Of Light"

Full-length play
 First prize: No winner.
 Second prize: Floy Quintos, "Fluid"
 Third prize: Frank Rivera, "The Adventures of Pilandok"

Filipino division
Tula
 First prize: Alwynn C. Javier, "Ang Magneto sa Gitna ng Aking Daigdig"
 Second prize: Raymund Magno Garlitos, "Nostos at Iba Pang Awit ng Pagtubos"
 Third prize: Jing Castro Panganiban, "Ilang Pagsasanay sa Pangungulila"

Maikling Kwento
 First prize: Reynaldo Duque, "Apong Simon"
 Second prize: Alvin Yapan, "Bomba"
 Third prize: Abdon Balde Jr., "Supay"

Futuristic Fiction
 First prize: Ricardo Fernando III, "Bagong Developments Sa Pagbuo Ng Mito Sa Lungsod"
 Second prize: Edgar Calabia Samar, "Project: Eyod"
 Third prize: Alvin Yapan, "Nostalgia"

Maikling Kwentong Pambata
 First prize: Renato Vibiesca, "Tahooieyy!"
 Second prize: Mae Astrid Tobias, "Bayong ng Kuting"
 Third prize: Alice Mallari, "Hayan Na Si Lolo Sinto"

Sanaysay
 First prize: Niles Jordan Breis, "Kung Tawagin Sila’y Angela Buruka: Sa Alaala ni Angela Manalang-Gloria"
 Second prize: Mjolnir Xoce Ong, "Adventures sa Kawatanan ng Rentas Internas"
 Third prize: John Iremil Teodoro, "Maikling Talambuhay ng Isang Makatang Ipinaglihi sa Paa ng Manok at Sirena"

Dulang May Isang Yugto
 First prize: Maria Kristine Chynna Roxas, "Traje De Boda"
 Second prize: Christian Vallez, "Twenty Questions"
 Third prize: Nathaniel Joseph de Mesa, "I Laugh You"

Dulang Ganap Ang Haba
 First prize: No winner
 Second prize: No winner
 Third prize: Mari Jina Endaya, "Trese: Isang Panayam"

Dulang Pantelebisyon
 First prize: Lazaro Torres Jr., "Kasama Sa Bahay"
 Second prize: Rolando Salvana, "Ang Buhay Kong Duling"
 Third prize: Nita Eden So, "Ay Em Nene"

Dulang Pampelikula
 First prize: Jose Maria Manalo, "Mangha"
 Second prize: Rica Leticia Arevalo, "ICU Bed #7"
 Third prize: Norman Wilwayco, "Kung Paano Kong Inayos ang Buhok Ko Matapos ang Mahaba-haba Ring Paglalakbay"

Regional Language division

Short story in Cebuano
 First prize: Mario Batusa, "Pagbugto Sa Kataposang Higot"
 Second prize: Lamberto Ceballos, "Tinggutom Sa Nayawak"
 Third prize: Arnel Mardoquio, "Tikbalangkapre"

Short story in Hiligaynon
 First prize: Alice Tan Gonzales, "Esperanza"
 Second prize: Lester Mark Carnaje, "Haligi Nga Asin"
 Third prize: Isabel Sebullen, "Mga Misteryo Sa Kagulangan"

Short story in Iloko
 First prize: Reynaldo A. Duque, "Leon, 15"
 Second prize: Ariel S. Tabag, "Sudario"
 Third prize:Clarito de Francia, "No Tallikudan Dagiti Tugot"

Kabataan division

Essay
 First prize: Cristina Monica Buensalido, "Learning To Fly"
 Second prize: Florianne Marie Jimenez, "Why I Am Who I Am"
 Third prize: Enrico Miguel Subido, "Contemplating the Concept of Sanctuary"

Sanaysay
 No winners

More winners by year

References
 

2003
Palanca